During the 2014–15 season, AZ competed in the Eredivisie for the 17th consecutive season and the KNVB CUP under new manager Marco van Basten, and then John van den Brom after Van Basten relinquished his role after health issues, becoming assistant to Van den Brom. Under Gertjan Verbeek and Dick Advocaat the previous season, AZ lost their title of KNVB Cup to PEC Zwolle after being eliminated in the semi-finals by eventual league winners Ajax and finishing eighth in the league.

Background
Following the 2013–14 season in which AZ broke their record for most competitive games in a season (58)  which started in the KNVB Cup on 27 July 2013 (an extra time loss to Ajax) and ended in the Eredivisie UEFA Europa League play-offs (3–0 loss to Groningen).

During this run of 58 games, Gertjan Verbeek was sacked and Dick Advocaat was brought out of retirement to replace Verbeek until the end of the season. The club finished in 8th and lost at the final stages of the play-offs for European football.

League results were inconsistent, although the club managed to make the quarter-finals of the 2013–14 UEFA Europa League, playing Atromitos, PAOK, Maccabi Haifa, Shakhter Karagandy, Slovan Liberec, Anzhi Makhachkala before being eliminated by Benfica.

For the new season, Marco van Basten left Heerenveen to sign a two-year contract at AZ, expressing his desire for the new challenge.

Transfers

Arrivals 

 The following players moved to AZ.

Departures

 The following players moved from AZ.

Loans
 The following players moved to new clubs whilst under contract at AZ.

Pre-season friendlies
AZ's pre-season began on 30 June with their first training session and consisted of seven official matches which started with an away friendly match on 5 July 2014 against Dutch amateurs SVW '27 from Heerhugowaard, just outside Alkmaar, and amateur club AFC '34 from Alkmaar. 

Following the games against amateur opposition the club played a friendly with the full AZ squad, with two teams (blue and red) where both teams were mixed with regular first team players.

Then followed a weeks training camp in Epe, Netherlands where AZ played their first games against professional teams in the pre-season; they played reserves against NEC, newly relegated from the Eredivisie, on the Saturday and then on Sunday fielded a full strength team against Gabala FK of Azerbaijan on the final day of the training camp.

After the training camp in Epe, AZ had a specially arranged friendly against Eerste Divisie side VVV to celebrate exactly 60th anniversary since the two teams first met in a competitive game. This special fixture had silverware to be won in the form of the Herman Teeuwen Bokkal, a pre-season competition organised by VVV to play larger teams for the trophy named after the legendary VVV player and scout Herman Teeuwen. After VVV winning against OFI Crete last year on this occasion AZ were victorious and awarded the cup;here is the AZ captain, Nemanja Gudelj, with the trophy.

After winning silverware, AZ agreed to play a friendly against German Bundesliga side 1899 Hoffenheim as part of their training camp in Switzerland. The final match of pre-season has been arranged for 1 August on the training field outside AFAS Stadion and will once again feature players from just the AZ squad. This game featured the squad wearing their new kits for the forthcoming season. The white (away) kit was worn by fringe members of the squad and black (away) kits were worn by the reserve and under-19 AZ players. This concluded the pre-season with only eight days remaining until the Eredivisie season opener against Heracles Almelo away.

Accurate as of 1 August

Statistics

Accurate as of 1 August

Eredivisie
The regular domestic league season began with an away fixture in the start of August 2015 to Heracles Almelo and finished away to Excelsior in mid-late May 2015.

Statistics

League table

KNVB Cup
AZ were drawn against the winners of the first round match on 27 August 2014 between Limburg amateurs EVV and Spirit'30, amateurs from Hoogkarspel for the second round of the KNVB Cup. EVV were victorious in the match, winning 4–0, and AZ will visit the 2,000 capacity Sportpark "In de Bandert" on 24 September 2014.

Statistics

Squad Performance

 Squad Numbers

Loanees

Domestic

Foreign

Accurate as of matchday four.

International appearances

The following first team players played for their respective nations during the 2014–15 season:

UEFA current ranking

Recent Eredivisie results

References 

AZ Alkmaar seasons
AZ Alkmaar